Manuel Teodoro is an American journalist. 

He was born in 1960 in New Orleans. His father is a Filipino and his mother was born in Cartagena de Indias. Teodoro majored in journalism from the University of Miami and started his career in 1984 as an editorial assistant for CBS News. Later he moved to Univision as a reporter and producer and became their correspondent in the Philippines. While staying in that country, he also anchored the evening news program "Newswatch" of the RPN television network.

After that he became the Hispanic New York based-correspondent for CNN. In 1994 he went to Colombia as correspondent for CNN and presenter of Noticiero CM&. Two years later he moved to Caracol TV, where he directed and hosted the 60 Minutes-like Séptimo día ("Seventh day") newsmagazine, which, despite of its success, was cancelled in 2000 because of the large amount of lawsuits against the show, all of them eventually won by Caracol TV. He then returned to CM&.

In 2007 Teodoro moved back for Caracol TV to direct and co-host, with Silvia Corzo, a new season of Séptimo día, which premiered 10 June 2007.

References

External links
 Manuel Teodoro (Caracol TV's Séptimo día)
 Manuel Teodoro at ColArte
 A 2000 interview following the first cancellation of Séptimo día
Bettina Teodoro, Journalists in hot spots: Manuel Teodoro, Thunderbird Online Magazine, University of British Columbia

1963 births
Living people
University of Miami School of Communication alumni
Writers from New Orleans
American male journalists
American writers of Filipino descent
American people of Colombian descent
Colombian reporters and correspondents
Colombian people of Filipino descent